Pythagoras Papastamatiou (12 April 1930 – November 12, 1979), mainly known by the mononym Pythagoras, was a Greek lyricist and playwright.

Biography 

He was born in 1930 in Agrinio where he lived until he became 18 years old. His family was descended from Samos. His parents met each other in Smyrna (now Izmir, Turkey), shortly before the Asia Minor Catastrophe. The Asia Minor Catastrophe influenced his work later in his life (in 1972, he co-wrote the song Mikra Asia (Μικρά Ασία "Asia Minor") along with Apostolos Kaldaras).

In 1940 (during the outbreak of World War II), Pythagoras started attending high school at Agrinio All-male High school. During the German occupation of Greece, he was hiding in Valtos. In 1944, he joined ELAS. He graduated from high school after the end of the war.

In 1945, he moved to Athens. He attended the Drama School of the Athens Conservatory, where he was a student of Dimitris Rontiris. He later worked for sometime in theatre, and later, in 1958, he became a playwright. In 1973, he became an irregular member of the Greek Playwrights Club. In 1974, he became an associate member and, in 1975, a regular member of that club.

He had been using the mononym "Pythagoras" since his high school years.

He died of a heart attack on November 12, 1979.

Discography
 Xanavlepo to mikro to amaxaki (Ξαναβλέπω το μικρό το αμαξάκι), Mary Lo, 1954
 Kathe limani ke kaimos (Κάθε λιμάνι και καημός), Panos Gavalas - Ria Kourti, 1964
 O Stamoulis o lochias (Ο Σταμούλης ο λοχίας)
 Otan pini mia gyneka (Όταν πίνει μια γυναίκα)
 Piso apo tis kalamies (Πίσω από τις καλαμιές), Marinella, 1966
 Kyra-Giorgaina (Κυρά-Γιώργαινα)
 Sta vrachia tis Piraïkis (Στα βράχια της Πειραϊκής), Stelios Kazantzidis - Marinella, 1968
 Nychta stasou (Νύχτα στάσου)
 O epipoleos (Ο επιπόλαιος)
 Albania (Αλβανία), Marinella, 1973
 Krasi, Thalassa Ke T' Agori Mou (Κρασί, θάλασσα και τ' αγόρι μου), Marinella, 1974

References

The first version of the article was translated from the article at the Greek Wikipedia (Main page)

External links
Pythagoras Papastamatiou on Nea Epohi
Pythagoras on the prefectural website

1930 births
1979 deaths
People from Agrinio
Greek dramatists and playwrights
Greek lyricists
20th-century Greek dramatists and playwrights